Susan (Susie) Santiago Billy (October 5, 1884 – November 20, 1968) born Andrea Susan Santiago, was a Native American Pomo basket weaver from the Hopland Band Pomo Indians of California in Northern California. Her parents were Silva Santiago and Tudy Marie Arnold.

In 1900 she married Cruz Billy, a leader at the Hopland Rancheria. Her granddaughter is artist Susan Billy who was inspired by her grandmother to learn the art of Pomo basketry and later studied under her great-aunt Elsie Allen for 15 years until her aunt's death in 1990. She was an curator, speaker and demonstrator at many cultural events of her home community.

Billy Susan takes a large part in museum exhibitions across the United States.

References 

Native American basket weavers
1884 births
1968 deaths
Pomo people
20th-century American women artists
Native Americans in California
Native American women artists
Women basketweavers
20th-century Native Americans
20th-century Native American women